René Englebert was a Belgian sport shooter who competed in the 1908 Summer Olympics.

References

Year of birth missing
Year of death missing
Belgian male sport shooters
ISSF pistol shooters
Olympic shooters of Belgium
Shooters at the 1908 Summer Olympics
Olympic silver medalists for Belgium
Olympic medalists in shooting
Medalists at the 1908 Summer Olympics
20th-century Belgian people